The Eclipse Special Award is part of the Eclipse Award program in United States Thoroughbred horse racing. The Special Award's purpose is to honor outstanding individual achievements in, or contributions to, the sport.  It is not awarded every year.

Honorees:
1971 : Robert J. Kleberg 
1974 : Charles Hatton 
1976 : Bill Shoemaker 
1980 : John T. Landry/Pierre Bellocq
1984 : C.V. Whitney
1985 : Arlington Park 
1987 : Anheuser-Busch
1988 : Edward J. DeBartolo Sr. 
1989 : Richard L. Duchossois
1994 : Eddie Arcaro/Johnny Longden 
1995 : Russell Baze
1998 : Oak Tree Racing Association
1999 : Laffit Pincay, Jr.
2000 : John Hettinger 
2001 : Sheikh Mohammed Al Maktoum
2002 : Keeneland Library
2004 : Dale Baird 
2005 : Cash Is King Racing Stable
2006 : Roy and Gretchen Jackson and the University of Pennsylvania School of Veterinary Medicine's George D. Widener Hospital for Large Animals at New Bolton Center
2007 : Kentucky Horse Park
2010 : Team Zenyatta
2011 : Rapid Redux
2013 : Thoroughbred Aftercare Alliance
2014: Old Friends Farm

References
 The Eclipse Awards at the Thoroughbred Racing Associations of America, Inc.
 The Bloodhorse.com Champion's history charts
 Rapid Redux awarded Special Eclipse

Horse racing awards
Horse racing in the United States